Bram N. Weinstein  is an American sportscaster who is the play by play broadcaster for the Washington Commanders of the National Football League (NFL). He previously worked at ESPN from 2008 to 2015, most notably as a host for SportsCenter.

Career
Prior to working for ESPN, Weinstein was a sports radio personality in Washington, D.C., working as the lead beat reporter for the Washington Redskins on Triple X ESPN Radio. He was the sideline reporter during radio game broadcasts, co-hosted Redskins Lunch and Redskins Radio and hosted The Bram Weinstein Show. Weinstein previously worked for CNN's Washington Bureau, KHAS-TV in Hastings, Nebraska and WTEM in Washington, D.C. In 2020, he joined the Washington Football Team to become their play by play radio broadcaster, serving alongside analyst DeAngelo Hall and host Julie Donaldson.

Personal
A native of Maryland, Weinstein was raised in a conservative Jewish household. He is married with two children.  He graduated from Springbrook High School in Silver Spring, Maryland. He continued his education at American University in Washington, D.C., where he was a member of the Sigma Alpha Mu fraternity and graduated with a bachelor's degree in broadcast journalism in 1995.

References

External links

Living people
People from Maryland
American Jews
American University School of Communication alumni
American radio personalities
American radio sports announcers
American television sports anchors
National Football League announcers
Year of birth missing (living people)
Washington Football Team announcers
Washington Commanders announcers
Sigma Alpha Mu